Y Liver was a Paris based contemporary art duo created in 1999 by David Liver (born in 1977 in Le Havre) and Rugiada Cadoni (born in 1977 in Italy). They ended their collaboration in 2013.

Biography
After receiving their diplomas from Brera Milan School of Fine Arts in 2003, they decided to settle in Paris.

They have participated in several group exhibitions in Europe, such as the first Prague Biennale in 2003, the Nuit Blanche in Paris in 2004, and the 11th Venice Architecture Biennale in 2008, where they were invited to present a project in the Venezuela pavilion.

Their first real solo exhibition was in Rome in 2001, at the Pino Casagrande Studio, in which Y Liver closed off the exhibition space while letting the public wait in the hall of the gallery. In 2007 they collaborated with the stylist Antonio Marras, known for being the director of the Kenzo house. Together they produced a performance that will be filmed, and they signed a tallit (Jewish prayer shawl) that was shown in Berlin in 2008.

It was in Berlin at Bimal Projects that their exhibition "Jude" aroused the concern of passersby, shocked by the large Jewish star painted in broad daylight by David on the window looking out onto Zimmerstrasse, across from the old Gestapo headquarters. The intervention of the police raised the curiosity of the press, and vandalism became the subject of a conference-performance held in collaboration with the philosopher  .

References

External links 
 Interview on CP
 Interview in Dossier Journal
 Whitewall Magazine
 Die Welt -    17. Oktober 2008

French artists
Italian artists